Freedom High School is located in Oakley, California, United States. It opened in 1996 on the grounds of Liberty High School, before moving to the new campus, as a part of the Liberty Union High School District. The current Liberty Union High School District contains Freedom, Liberty, Heritage, and Independence High Schools.

Clubs and extracurricular activities

Controversy
Controversy surrounded the formation of a Caucasian Club in November 2003 at the school. Freshman Lisa McClelland gathered about 250 signatures from students and adults to start a club that would focus attention on European heritage and history. Other societies already found in the school include the Black Student Union, the Latinos Unidos and the ALOHA club for Asian-American students. Lou Calabro, president of the European-American Issues Forum, became an informal advisor of the club and sent letters to two civil-rights organizations that the school's administration be investigated. However, the Caucasian Club was accused of fueling racial tension, and was forced to disband. McClelland eventually transferred out of the school.

If You Really Knew Me
Freedom High School was one stop along the way on the 2010 MTV reality show If You Really Knew Me.  The show chronicles high schools across the nation undergoing a "challenge day" where students share their stories.  The idea of challenge day is to break down cliques within the school, especially those that result from racism. The school now has an on-campus group that holds mini challenge days frequently for classes.

References 

 Freedom High School Planner/Handbook 2009

See also
 List of high schools in California

High schools in Contra Costa County, California
Educational institutions established in 1996
Public high schools in California
1996 establishments in California